Forrest Nedward Mashaw (February 2, 1898 – June 1970) was an American Negro league outfielder in the 1920s.

Career
A native of North Carolina, Mashaw made his Negro leagues debut in 1920 with the Indianapolis ABCs. He went on to play for the Homestead Grays in 1921 and 1922. Mashaw died in Braddock, Pennsylvania in 1970 at age 72.

References

Further reading
 Press staff (July 1, 1917). "War Orations Feature the North Braddock High School Commencement". p. 56
 News staff (September 8, 1919). "Italians-Greys Game by Innings". p. 13         
 Post-Gazette staff (December 3, 1943). "Selectees Announced". Pittsburgh Post-Gazette. p. 18
 Johnson, Earl (December 2, 1950). "Sports Whirl". Courier. p. 16 
 Courier staff (January 5, 1952). "Tourney Winners". p. 16

External links
 and Baseball-Reference Black Baseball stats and Seamheads

1898 births
1970 deaths
Date of death missing
Place of birth missing
Homestead Grays players
Indianapolis ABCs players
20th-century African-American sportspeople